The Fourteenth G-15 summit was held in Tehran, Iran on May 17–20, 2010. The bi-annual summit agenda of the Group of 15 (G-15) encompassed a range of issues.

The gathering brought together leaders, representatives and policymakers from non-aligned nations.  African G-15 nations are Algeria, Egypt, Kenya, Nigeria, Senegal, and Zimbabwe. Those from Asia are India, Indonesia, Iran, Malaysia, and Sri Lanka. Latin American G-15 nations include Argentina, Brazil, Chile,  Jamaica, Mexico, Peru and Venezuela.

Overview

The Group of 15 was established at the Ninth Non-Aligned Movement summit in Belgrade, Yugoslavia in September 1989.  The name of this group is unchanging, but its composition has expanded to 18 countries.

The G-15 is composed of countries from Africa, Asia, North America and South America. These non-aligned nations joined together to create a forum to foster cooperation and develop information which can be presented to other international groups, such as the World Trade Organization and the Group of Eight. The G-15 nations have a common goal of enhanced growth and prosperity. The group aims to encourage cooperation among developing countries in the areas of investment, trade, and technology.

Meeting independently in Tehran, ministers from Brazil, Iran and Turkey negotiated an agreement on principles designed to revive a stalled nuclear fuel-swap deal backed by the United Nations.

Leaders at the summit
Those nations represented at the summit were Algeria, Argentina, Brazil, Chile, Egypt, India, Indonesia, Iran,  Jamaica, Kenya, Malaysia, Mexico, Nigeria, Peru, Senegal, Sri Lanka, Venezuela, and Zimbabwe. The G-15 membership has expanded to 18 countries, but the name has remained unchanged.

The leaders of G-15 nations are core contributors in summit meetings, but only some of the heads-of-state were at the Teheran event:

Guest participants
 Belarus was represented by its deputy Vice-President  The Russian ambassador to Iran was in attendance.

Priorities
The G-15 perceive an ongoing need to expand dialogue with the G8 and with the G20.  The G-15 want to help bridge the gap between developing countries and the more developed and industrialized nations. The fact that some of the G-15 are simultaneously members of these other forums is expected to be helpful.

Issues
G-15 nations are united by shared perceptions of global economic issues; and the G-15 provides a structure for working out common strategies for dealing with these issues.  For example, the G-15 opposes using the international economic and financial systems as political instruments.  The group condemns the use of coercive economic measures or laws against developing countries.

G-15 nations have joined together in hopes of escaping from the more polemical atmosphere in other multi-national groups and organizations, such as the Group of 77 (G-77).  For example, the 14th G-15 summit called for reform of Bretton Woods institutions and examining alternate sources of financing for the developing world.

Schedule and Agenda
The summit was a venue for three-way talks between Turkish Prime Minister Erdogan and Brazilian President Lula da Silva and Iranian President Ahmadinejad.  Their negotiations led to the announcement of a program of exchange in Turkey of Iran's low-enriched uranium for nuclear fuel processed abroad.  The announcement of a diplomatic break-through was met with scepticism in Western capitals.

The summit focused on the importance of cooperation in facing the current challenges of food, energy, climate change, health and trade.  The G-15 agenda included discussions of the Doha Round, intellectual properties and the global financial crisis.

The chairmanship of the G-15 passed from Iran to Sri Lanka at the end of the summit; and Sri Lanka will host the next scheduled group meeting in Colombo, the 15th G-15 summit in 2012.

See also
 Group of 15

Notes

References
 Chauhan, Sandeep. (1997).   Demand for New International Economic Order.  New Delhi: MD Publications. ;   OCLC 222017407

External links
Official Web Site
Official Tehran Summit Web Site

2010
2010 in Iran
2010 conferences
21st-century diplomatic conferences (Global)
2010 in international relations
Diplomatic conferences in Iran
21st century in Tehran
May 2010 events in Iran